Sylvia is a 2018 Nigerian supernatural thriller film directed by Daniel Oriahi, written by Vanessa Kanu, and produced by Ekene Som Mekwunye for Trino Motion Pictures.
The movie was screened at the Nollywood Week in Paris on May 5, 2018 and was released across cinemas on September 21.

Plot
Richard Okezie decides to leave Sylvia, his lifelong imaginary friend and lover for Gbemi a flesh-and-blood real woman, but complications arise when Sylvia decides to destroy Richard's peaceful life.

Cast
Chris Attoh as Richard Okezie
Zainab Balogun as Sylvia
Ini Dima-Okojie as Gbemi
Udoka Oyeka as Obaro
Ijeoma Grace Agu as Hawa
Captain Coker as Little Richard
Amina Mustapha as Little Sylvia
Precious Shedrack as Teenage Sylvia
Dumpet Enebeli as Teenage Obaro
Ndifreke Josiah Etim as Teenage Richard
Mohammed Abdullahi Saliu as Mr Hassan
Omotunde Adebowale David (Lolo) as Mrs Iweta
Lord Frank as Mr Temidayo Davies
Bolaji Ogunmola as Nurse Karen
Elsie Eluwa as Richards Mum

Release
The movie was first screened in May 2018 at the Nollywood Week Paris. The official Trailer was released August 6, 2018. After a premiere at Terra Kulture on the 16th of September, the movie was made available in all cinemas on September 21, 2018

Critical reception

Sylvia received reviews from critics. 
Franklin Ugobude of PulseNG said, “There's a lot to like about Sylvia really: for one, there's this fresh feel to an existing story on spirituality, something that is pretty common in our world today”.

Precious Nwogwu of MamaZeus described the movie as “Spellbinding: The best Nollywood thriller in recent times”.

The Maveriq of Tha Revue’s take was “Sylvia is one of the darkest thrillers that has ever come out of Nollywood and I must commend Trino studios for their courage in making this film because this isn’t the quintessential Nollywood production”.

Oris Aigbokhaevbolo in his feature review on BellaNaija shared “It was heartening to have the origin of the spirit-spouse be broached but never really explained. The film shows it is the product of a Nigerian mind in how the existence of the spiritual realm is taken as a given, and its characters are modern figures wrestling ancient myths, citified kids fighting what we think of us as village people.”

Accolades

Film festivals

See also
 List of Nigerian films of 2018

References

External links

 

2018 films
2018 thriller films
Nigerian thriller films
English-language Nigerian films
2010s English-language films